, provisional designation , is a resonant trans-Neptunian object in the outermost region of the Solar System, guesstimated at approximately  in diameter. It was discovered on 13 March 2010, by astronomers with the Pan-STARRS survey at Haleakala Observatory, Hawaii, United States.

Discovery 

The body's observation arc begins with a precovery taken by the Sloan Digital Sky Survey in April 2000, nearly 10 years prior to its official discovery observation at Haleakala Observatory. The discovery was announced in a Minor Planet Electronic Circular in July 2016, after additional observations by Pan-STARRS had been found (2010–2013), preceding the team's original observation from 11 January 2015, which led to the assignment of the object's first and only provisional designation, . The observations were made with Pan-STARRS 1.8-meter Ritchey–Chrétien telescope, and B. Gibson, T. Goggia, N. Primak, A. Schultz, and M. Willman were the observers.

Orbit and classification 

 is a resonant trans-Neptunian object in a 2:5 orbital resonance with Neptune, which means that it orbits the Sun exactly twice while Neptune orbits the Sun five times. Several objects in this resonance with a period of 410 years have been found, including .

It orbits the Sun at a distance of 41.4–68.9 AU once every 409 years and 5 months (149,540 days; semi-major axis of 55.14 AU). Its orbit has an eccentricity of 0.25 and an inclination of 27° with respect to the ecliptic. It still has an orbital uncertainty of 1 and 3, respectively.

Numbering and naming 

This minor planet was numbered by the Minor Planet Center on 9 June 2017 and received the number  in the minor planet catalog. As of 2018, it has not been named.

Physical characteristics 

According to the Johnston's archive and American astronomer Michael Brown,  measures 468 and 479 kilometers in diameter based on an assumed albedo of 0.09 and 0.07, respectively. As of 2018, no rotational lightcurve has been obtained from photometric observations. The body's rotation period, pole and shape remain unknown.

References

External links 
 MPEC 2016-O294: 2015 AM281, Minor Planet Electronic Circular, 24 July 2016
 M.P.E.C. statistics for F51 – All MPECs
 Image of 2015 AM281, at San Marcello, May 2017 (blogpost)
 List of Known Trans-Neptunian Objects, Johnston's Archive
 The largest asteroids and outer solar system objects, Johnston's Archive, 2018
 List Of Centaurs and Scattered-Disk Objects, Minor Planet Center
 Discovery Circumstances: Numbered Minor Planets (495001)-(500000) – Minor Planet Center
 (495603) 2015 AM281, Small Bodies Data Ferret
 
 

495603
495603
495603
495603
20100313